The Madison Senators were a minor league baseball team based in Madison, Wisconsin that played between 1907 and 1914 in the Wisconsin-Illinois League.

References

External links
Baseball Reference

Defunct minor league baseball teams
Baseball teams established in 1907
Baseball teams disestablished in 1914
1907 establishments in Wisconsin
1914 disestablishments in Wisconsin
Wisconsin-Illinois League teams
Professional baseball teams in Wisconsin
Sports in Madison, Wisconsin
Wisconsin State League teams
Defunct baseball teams in Wisconsin